The Cabin Creek Historic District is a privately owned small settlement about five miles west of Easton in Kittitas County, Washington and about 70 miles southeast of Seattle via Interstate 90.  It was founded as a sawmill camp along the main line of the Northern Pacific Railway (now the Burlington Northern Railway) in 1916, to the east of the railway's tunnel in the Stampede Pass.

History
The settlement has an elevation of 2,400 feet and is just east of the crest of the Cascade Range. It is wedged between the railway on the north, Cabin Creek, a tributary of the Yakima River, and Cabin Mountain, which has a peak of 4,500 feet.

Buildings remaining from the original camp include the sawmill, the company store, about 24 one-story cabins with associated woodsheds and outhouses, and a schoolhouse, the only building in the original camp which was painted.

The workers' cabins were constructed from unpainted lumber provided free by the mill.  Generally they were constructed as one room buildings with tar paper roofs, and were added to as the worker married and had children.  Kitchens, extra bedrooms, and sometimes parlors were generally added.  Furnishings would include wood-burning stoves, kerosene lamps, and hand cranked phonographs.

Cabin Creek is private property.  Please observe the signage and do not trespass onto the property or into the residents' yards.  Trespassers will be escorted off of the property.

References

Buildings and structures completed in 1916
Kittitas County, Washington
Historic districts on the National Register of Historic Places in Washington (state)
Northern Pacific Railway
Company towns in Washington (state)
National Register of Historic Places in Kittitas County, Washington